Trælnes is a village in the municipality of Brønnøy in Nordland county, Norway.  The village is located along the Norwegian County Road 17 and along the Torgfjorden, just north of the village of Berg (in neighboring Sømna Municipality) and east of the mountain Torghatten.  The Trælnes Chapel is located in this village.

References

Brønnøy
Villages in Nordland